Arikaree Glacier is an alpine glacier located in a cirque to the north of Arikaree Peak and south of Navajo Peak, in Roosevelt National Forest in the U.S. state of Colorado.

See also
List of glaciers in the United States

References

Glaciers of Colorado
Landforms of Boulder County, Colorado